The University of South Dakota School of Law also known as University of South Dakota Knudson School of Law or USD Law in Vermillion, South Dakota, United States, is a professional school of the University of South Dakota and the only law school in the state of South Dakota. Established in 1901, by U.S. Ambassador Bartlett Tripp and U.S. Senator Thomas Sterling. The law school is home to approximately 168 students and has more than 3,000 alumni. With 168 J.D. candidates, it is currently the second-smallest law school and smallest public law school student population among the American Bar Association accredited law schools.

The University of South Dakota School of Law has produced 8 Governors of South Dakota including as well as other key figures important to the development of the state, many judges of the  South Dakota Supreme Court and the U.S. District Court for the District of South Dakota, 13 members of the U.S. Congress, 19 Attorneys General of South Dakota, and 14 U.S. Attorneys for the District of South Dakota, earning it the nickname "the Alma Mater of the State."

History

1901-1911 (The Sterling Years)

The University of South Dakota College of Law was founded in 1901. Thomas Sterling served as the law school's first dean until 1911 when he left to become the third U.S. Senator from South Dakota. During the Sterling years, the law school proved successful in developing attorneys for the new state. In fact, by the time Sterling was in Congress, two of his earliest graduates William Williamson and Royal C. Johnson were Congressmen themselves. Before Sterling and the College of Law, the few lawyers there were, came from eastern states or read law for admission into the bar.

Along with Sterling, U.S. Ambassador to Austria Bartlett Tripp, was an integral part of establishing the school. Tripp was returning to South Dakota from his diplomatic post in Austria at the turn of the century. Tripp had been initially considered to be the running mate of President William McKinley, his friend and Albany Law School classmate, but was overlooked in lieu of then-Governor of New York Teddy Roosevelt. With no other political opportunities left to him, Tripp devoted his full attention to establishing the College of Law. He played many roles in the law school, not only was he the school's first taxation and constitutional law professor but he had served as President of the first bar association, the Constitutional Convention of South Dakota & the commission to codify South Dakota's laws, as well as the last Chief Justice of the Dakota Territory Supreme Court. Tripp and his son-in-law Charles Hall Dillon, a fellow professor, provided much of the law library's contents and upon Tripp's death donated much of his estate to the College of Law. It is speculated that had William McKinley not overlooked him for Vice President of the United States the College of Law may not have been founded as soon as it was. Thomas Sterling's 1911 departure was partly led by the death of his friend and colleague Bartlett Tripp.

1911-1984

In 1911, Marshall McKusick became the school's second and subsequent longest-serving dean, serving until his death in 1950. The 1927 class proved to be one of the strongest classes in USD Law history, producing Frank Biegelmeier, George T. Mickelson, E.Y. Berry, Joseph Bottum, and Harold Lovre. A stronger class did not come until 1975, when USD Law produced Steven L. Zinter, David Gilbertson, Glen A. Severson, Steve T. Kirby, and Tim Johnson. In 1982, the College of Law moved from its then-82-year-old building to a new building and was renamed the 'School of Law'. During this period the law school was led by the 11th Deputy Attorney General of the United States from the Nixon Administration, Ralph E. Erickson.

1984-2016
In 1984, South Dakota Supreme Court abolished the nearly century old practice of diploma privilege, which previously admitted School of Law graduates into South Dakota bar without examination. Also in 1984, Camden 28 member and Indian Law scholar Frank Pommersheim joined the faculty. From 1993 until 2011 Barry Vickrey, a Vanderbilt law alumnus, served as Dean of the School of Law.  During Vickrey's tenure, noted federalist professor Patrick Garry joined the faculty in 2003.  Former CEO of the Mayo Clinic, Mike Myers served on the faculty as an elder law professor. Myers, known for his eccentric behavior, resigned in 2012 and ran for Governor of South Dakota in the next election. In 2013, Thomas Earl Geu a Nebraska law alumnus, was hired from his previous position of interim dean into full dean.

2016-present
In June 2017, George "Mark" Mickelson, son and grandson of alumnus George S. Mickelson and George T. Mickelson chaired the USD Law Task Force to determine if the location of the School of Law should be moved to Sioux Falls, South Dakota. The USD Law Task Force voted 8–5 to keep the School of Law in Vermilion, South Dakota, but would develop non-degree programs there.  On March 20, 2018, Thomas Geu announced his intentions to resign as dean of the School of Law. Neil Fulton, the Federal Public Defender for the District of South Dakota and District of North Dakota, became the new dean of the School of Law.

On May 15, 2020, the council of the American Bar Association's Section of Legal Education and Admissions to the Bar met remotely and determined this school and nine others had significant noncompliance with Standard 316.  This Standard was revised in 2019 to provide that at least 75% of an accredited law school's graduates who took a bar exam must pass one within two years of graduation.  The school was asked to submit a report by Feb. 1, 2021; and, if the council did not find the report demonstrated compliance, the school would be asked to appear before the council at its May, 2021 meeting.  On February 26, 2021, the ABA’s council posted that the school was now in compliance with the standard.

Demographics and rankings
Admission is competitive; for the class entering in the fall of 2010, 220 out of 449 J.D. applicants were offered admission (48.9%), with 75 matriculating. They came from 46 colleges and 14 states.  58% percent were South Dakota residents, 42% were female, and 9% minorities. The 25th, 50th, and 75th percentile LSAT scores and GPAs for the class were 150/153/156 and 3.18/3.44/3.73 respectively. The U.S. News & World Report law school rankings placed South Dakota at 65th of the law schools in the U.S. in 2010. In 2013, The National Jurist listed South Dakota Law in the top 5 schools for "Best Value."  In 2013, The National Law Journal listed South Dakota Law #5 for employment in the government and Public Interest sector, as the law school alumni populates many of the prominent government positions within the state.

The U.S. News & World Report placed South Dakota at 128 of 215 law schools in the U.S. in 2018 and in 2019. For the 2020 U.S. News & World Report law school rankings placed South Dakota as the 39th best public law school. University of South Dakota School of Law is accredited by the American Bar Association and is a member of the Association of American Law Schools. According to South Dakota's official 2013 ABA-required disclosures, 60.6% of the Class of 2013 obtained full-time, long-term, JD-required employment nine months after graduation, making it the best in the region with the exception of the University of Minnesota Law School. Within the state of South Dakota, it is widely regarded as the most historically significant and venerable educational institution due to its long-time role of producing most of the lawyers of the state.

Noted Faculty

Current
Patrick Garry, Constitutional Law Professor 
Brendan Johnson, adjunct Law Professor and former U.S. Attorney for the District of South Dakota.
Myanna Dellinger, Law Professor and international relations specialist
Neil Fulton, current Dean and former Federal Public Defender for United States Court of Appeals for the Eighth Circuit and Chief of Staff to Governor Mike Rounds.

Former
Thomas Sterling, 1st Dean of the College of Law and U.S. Senator from South Dakota. Namesake of Sterling Honors. 
Bartlett Tripp, 1st Professor of Law, 25th U.S. Ambassador to Austria, last Chief Justice of Dakota Territory Supreme Court, and first president of the South Dakota Bar Association.
Ralph E. Erickson, 5th Dean of the College of Law and 11th Deputy Attorney General of the United States during the Nixon Administration.
Charles Hall Dillon, Professor of Law, U.S. Representative from South Dakota and Associate Justice of the South Dakota Supreme Court. Namesake of the Dillon Lecture Series.
Roger Baron, Professor of Law, ERISA scholar, and counsel in Sereboff v. Mid Atlantic Medical Services, Inc.
Mike Myers, Professor of Law, CEO of Mayo Clinic, and candidate for Governor of South Dakota.
Frank Pommersheim, American Indian Law Professor, Camden 28 member, Chief Judge for the Cheyenne River Sioux Tribal Court of Appeals and the Chief Justice of the Rosebud Sioux Supreme Court

Noted alumni

The University of South Dakota School of Law has historically produced a number of noted alumni among which include eight governors, thirteen members of the U.S. congressional delegation from South Dakota, nineteen state attorneys general, thirteen U.S. Attorneys, twenty-eight state supreme court justices, and twelve federal judges including the Chief Judge of the U.S. Court of Appeals for the Eighth Circuit, Roger Leland Wollman and the Chief Judge of the U.S. District Court for the District of South Dakota, Jeffrey L. Viken.

Academia

Attorneys General

Business

Governors and Lieutenant Governors

State Court of Appeals Judges

State Supreme Court Justices

United States District Attorneys

United States District Court

United States Court of Appeals

United States House of Representatives

United States Tax Court

United States Senate

United States Military

See also
Attorney General of South Dakota
South Dakota Supreme Court
United States Attorney for the District of South Dakota

References

External links
 

Educational institutions established in 1901
1901 establishments in South Dakota
Law schools in South Dakota
Law
Education in Clay County, South Dakota